This is a list of rivers in the Democratic Republic of the Congo. This list is arranged by drainage basin, with respective tributaries indented under each larger stream's name.

Atlantic Ocean

Chiloango River
Congo River
M'pozo River
Inkisi River (Zadi River)
Ndjili River
Lukaya River
Lukunga River
Kasai River (Kwa River)
Fimi River 
Lukenie River
Lokoro River
Lotoi River
Kwango River
Kwilu River
Inzia River
Kwenge River
Lutshima River
Wamba River
Bakali River
Kamtsha River
Luele River
Lubue River
Loange River
Lushiko River
Sankuru River
Lubudi River
Lubefu River
Lubi River
Fwa River
Mbuji-Mayi River (Bushimaie River)
Luilu River
Lubilash River
Luenbe River
Lutshuadi River
Lulua River
Loebo River
Lovua River
Chicapa River
Luachimo River
Chiumbe River
Luia River
Lueta River (Kaongeshi River)
Ubangi River
Ngiri River
Lua River
Mbomou River
Bili River
Uele River
Bima River
Uere River
Bomokandi River
Duru River
Dungu River
Garamba River
Kibali River
Nzoro River
Ruki River
Momboyo River
Lokolo River
Luilaka River
Loile River
Busira River
Salonga River
Yenge River
Lomela River
Tshuapa River
Ikelemba River
Lulonga River
Lopori River
Bolombo River
Maringa River
Lomako River
Mongala River
Ebola River
Itimbiri River
Tele River
Likati River
Rubi River
Aruwimi River
Lulu River
Nepoko River
Ituri River
Lenda River
Lomami River
Lindi River
Tshopo River
Maiko River
Lualaba River (upper Congo River)
Lowa River
Oso River
Ulindi River
Lugulu River
Elila River
Luama River
Lukuga River
Luizi River
Lake Tanganyika
Ruzizi River
Mulobozi River
Luvidjo River
Luvua River
Lukushi River
Luapula River
Lufira River
Lubudi River

Mediterranean Sea
Nile
White Nile
Lake Albert
Semliki River
Rutshuru River
Ishasha River (via Lake Edward)

References
Prentice-Hall, Inc., American World Atlas 1985
National Geographic, Atlas of the World Revised 6th Edition 1992
United Nations 2011
GEOnet Names Server

Congo, Democratic Republic of the
Rivers